"Tiger" is a song by the Swedish pop band ABBA. The song was released on the 1976 album Arrival.

History
"Tiger" is written from the perspective of a threatening entity warning the listener of the dangers of the city: "People who fear me never come near me, I am the tiger". The exact meaning behind "Tiger" is debated, although most speculators agree "tiger" is used as a metaphor for dangerous aspects of city life. Some hypothesize the tiger represents a stalker or serial killer, while others believe the tiger symbolizes the harmful nature of illicit drugs.

The vocals for the song were sung by Agnetha Fältskog and Anni-Frid Lyngstad.

Performance
In the 1977 concert tours, the song was preceded by "the sound of helicopters booming over the speakers". ABBA also performed the song in the film ABBA: The Movie.

At the ABBA tribute band concert Live Music of Abba by the Arrival from Sweden, "Tiger" was the show opener.

Music video
The music video for "Tiger" features all four members of ABBA dressed in denim clothing riding in a Chevy at nighttime. It was aired on the "ABBA-Dabba-Dooo!" TV special.

Critical reception
Bright lights, dark shadows: the real story of Abba described the song as "rocky". The Guardian described the song as "gripping".

References

1976 songs
ABBA songs
Songs written by Benny Andersson and Björn Ulvaeus